This article summarizes the highlights of professional and amateur golf in the year 2020. The calendar was significantly disrupted by the COVID-19 pandemic, with many events being canceled or postponed, or taking place without spectators.

Men's professional golf

Major championships
16–19 July: The Open Championship – Canceled due to the COVID-19 pandemic
6–9 August (14–17 May): PGA Championship – Collin Morikawa won by two strokes over Paul Casey and Dustin Johnson; it was his first major championship victory.
17–20 September (18–21 June): U.S. Open – Bryson DeChambeau won his first major championship title by six strokes over Matthew Wolff; he was the only player to finish under par.
12–15 November (9–12 April): Masters Tournament – Dustin Johnson won by five strokes over Im Sung-jae and Cameron Smith. It was his first Masters championship and his second major championship. He set a new tournament record of 20 strokes under par.

World Golf Championships
20–23 February: WGC-Mexico Championship – Patrick Reed won by one stroke over Bryson DeChambeau; it was his second win in the tournament.
25–29 March: WGC-Dell Technologies Match Play – Canceled due to the COVID-19 pandemic
30 July – 2 August (2–5 July): WGC-FedEx St. Jude Invitational – Justin Thomas won by three strokes; it was his second win in the tournament.
29 October – 1 November: WGC-HSBC Champions – Canceled due to the COVID-19 pandemic

FedEx Cup playoff events

20–23 August (13–16 August): The Northern Trust – Dustin Johnson won by 11 strokes over Harris English; it was his fifth career tournament win in the FedEx Cup playoffs, and his third in the Northern Trust (formerly known as The Barclays).
27–30 August (20–23 August): BMW Championship – Jon Rahm won in a playoff over Dustin Johnson. It was his first FedEx Cup playoff tournament victory.
4–7 September (27–30 August): Tour Championship – Dustin Johnson won by three strokes over Xander Schauffele and Justin Thomas, to win the FedEx Cup for the first time. Johnson had started the tournament 3 strokes ahead of Thomas and 7 strokes ahead of Schauffele, who returned the lowest aggregate score.

Other leading PGA Tour events
12–15 March: The Players Championship – Incomplete; canceled following completion of the first round due to the COVID-19 pandemic.

For a complete list of PGA Tour results see 2019–20 PGA Tour.

Leading European Tour events
8–11 October (10–13 September): BMW PGA Championship – Tyrrell Hatton won by four strokes from Victor Perez.
10–13 December (19–22 November): DP World Tour Championship, Dubai – Englishman Matt Fitzpatrick won his second DP World Tour Championship, defeating Lee Westwood by one stroke.

For a complete list of European Tour results see 2020 European Tour.

Team events
25–27 September: Ryder Cup – Postponed until 2021 due to the COVID-19 pandemic

Tour leaders
PGA Tour
FedEx Cup –  Dustin Johnson
Leading money winner –  Justin Thomas (US$7,344,040)
European Tour –  Lee Westwood (3,128 points)
Japan Golf Tour – season extended into 2021
Asian Tour – 
PGA Tour of Australasia – season extended into 2021
Sunshine Tour – season extended into 2021

Awards
PGA Tour
PGA Player of the Year –  Justin Thomas
Player of the Year (Jack Nicklaus Trophy) –  Dustin Johnson
Vardon Trophy –  Webb Simpson
Byron Nelson Award –  Webb Simpson
Rookie of the Year (Arnold Palmer Award) –  Scottie Scheffler
Payne Stewart Award –  Zach Johnson
European Tour
Golfer of the Year –  Lee Westwood
Rookie of the Year –  Sami Välimäki
Korn Ferry Tour
Player of the Year – season extended into 2021

Results from other tours
2020–21–22 Asian Tour
2020–21 PGA Tour of Australasia
2020 PGA Tour Canada – season canceled due to the COVID-19 pandemic.
2020 Challenge Tour
2020–21 Japan Golf Tour
2020–21 PGA Tour Latinoamérica
2020–21 Sunshine Tour
2020–21 Korn Ferry Tour
LocaliQ Series

Other happenings
9 February: Rory McIlroy regained the top spot in the Official World Golf Ranking, gaining it for the eighth time, replacing Brooks Koepka.
20 March: Official World Golf Ranking frozen at week 11 due to the COVID-19 pandemic.
14 June: Official World Golf Ranking restarted at week 24 with the resumption of the PGA Tour and Korn Ferry Tour.
19 July: Jon Rahm gained the top spot in the Official World Golf Ranking for the first time, replacing McIlroy.
2 August: Justin Thomas gained the top spot in the Official World Golf Ranking for the second time, replacing Rahm.
9 August: Rahm regained the number one ranking after finishing in a tie for thirteenth place at the PGA Championship.
23 August: Dustin Johnson replaced Rahm as number one in the Official World Golf Ranking following victory in The Northern Trust; it was the sixth time Johnson had reached the top spot.

Women's professional golf

LPGA majors
6–9 August (23–26 July): The Evian Championship – Canceled due to the COVID-19 pandemic
20–23 August: Women's British Open – World number 304 Sophia Popov won by two strokes from Thidapa Suwannapura; it was her first major tournament victory.
10–13 September (2–5 April): ANA Inspiration – Mirim Lee won her first major championship, defeating Brooke Henderson and Nelly Korda with a birdie on the first hole of a sudden-death playoff; she made the playoff by chipping in for eagle on the final hole of regulation play.
8–11 October (25–28 June): KPMG Women's PGA Championship – Kim Sei-young won her first major championship by five strokes over fellow countrywoman Inbee Park.
10–13 December (4–7 June): U.S. Women's Open – Kim A-lim, in her first start in a tournament in the United States, won by one stroke over Ko Jin-young and Amy Olson. Kim birdied her last three holes and finished three-under par.

Additional LPGA Tour events
17–20 December (19–22 November): CME Group Tour Championship – World number 1 Ko Jin-young won by five shots, also finishing first in the money list in the process.

For a complete list of LPGA Tour results, see 2020 LPGA Tour.
For a complete list of Ladies European Tour results see 2020 Ladies European Tour.

Team events
27–30 August: International Crown – Canceled due to the COVID-19 pandemic

Money list leaders
LPGA Tour –  Ko Jin-young ($1,667,925)
Ladies European Tour –  Emily Kristine Pedersen (1,249.35 points)
LPGA of Japan Tour – season extended into 2021
LPGA of Korea Tour –  Kim Hyo-joo (₩797,137,207)
ALPG Tour –  Minjee Lee (A$63,618, 2019/20 season)
Symetra Tour –  Ana Belac (US$49,081)

Other tour results
2020 ALPG Tour
2020–21 LPGA of Japan Tour
2020 LPGA of Korea Tour
2020 Symetra Tour

Other happenings
20 March: Women's World Golf Rankings frozen at week 11 due to the COVID-19 pandemic.
20 July: Women's World Golf Rankings resume with altered computation of ranking, back-computed to week 20, when the LPGA of Korea Tour resumed play.

Senior men's professional golf

Senior majors
21–24 May: Senior PGA Championship – Canceled due to the COVID-19 pandemic
25–28 June: U.S. Senior Open – Canceled due to the COVID-19 pandemic
23–26 July: Senior Open Championship – Canceled due to the COVID-19 pandemic
13–16 August (9–12 July): Senior Players Championship – Jerry Kelly won his first senior major title by two strokes over Scott Parel.
24–27 September (7–10 May): Regions Tradition – Canceled due to the COVID-19 pandemic

Full results
2020–21 PGA Tour Champions season – season extended into 2021
2020 European Senior Tour – season canceled due to the COVID-19 pandemic.

Senior women's professional golf
9–12 July: U.S. Senior Women's Open – Canceled due to the COVID-19 pandemic
30 July – 1 August: Senior LPGA Championship – Canceled due to the COVID-19 pandemic

Amateur golf
16–19 January: Latin America Amateur Championship – Abel Gallegos won by four strokes over Aaron Terrazas.
22–27 May: NCAA Division I Women's Golf Championships – Canceled due to COVID-19 pandemic
29 May – 3 June: NCAA Division I Men's Golf Championships – Canceled due to COVID-19 pandemic
12–14 June: Curtis Cup – Postponed until 2021 due to COVID-19 pandemic
3–9 August: U.S. Women's Amateur – Rose Zhang defeated defending champion Gabriela Ruffels in the final, with the match going to the 38th hole.
10–16 August: U.S. Amateur – Tyler Strafaci defeated Ollie Osborne in the final, 1 up.
24–29 August (15–20 June): The Amateur Championship – Joe Long defeated Joe Harvey, 4 and 3, in the final.
24–29 August (23–27 June): Womens Amateur Championship – Aline Krauter defeated Annabell Fuller, 1 up, in the final.
22–25 September (24–27 June): European Amateur – Matti Schmid successfully defended his 2019 title.
25–28 September: Asia-Pacific Amateur Championship – Canceled due to COVID-19 pandemic
30 September – 3 October (22–25 July): European Ladies Amateur Championship – Paula Schulz-Hanssen of Germany won in a playoff over Chloé Salort of France.
14–17 October: Espirito Santo Trophy – Canceled due to COVID-19 pandemic
21–24 October: Eisenhower Trophy – Canceled due to COVID-19 pandemic

Golf in multi-sport events
 30 July – 8 August: Summer Olympics – Postponed until 2021.

Deaths
9 January – Pete Dye (born 1925), American golf course architect and member of the World Golf Hall of Fame.
17 February – Mickey Wright (born 1935), American golfer and member of the World Golf Hall of Fame. She won 82 LPGA Tour tournaments, including 13 majors.
26 March – John O'Leary (born 1949), Irish professional golfer who won twice on the European Tour.
12 April – Doug Sanders (born 1933), American professional golfer who had 20 wins on the PGA Tour.
23 April – Peter Gill (born 1930), English professional golf who played on the European Tour.
27 April – Edean Anderson Ihlanfeldt (born 1930), American amateur golfer who won the Canadian Women's Amateur and the U.S. Senior Women's Amateur.
28 April – Bob Betley (born 1940), American professional golfer who won on the Senior PGA Tour.
15 May – Ernie Gonzalez (born 1961), American professional golfer who had one PGA Tour win.
15 May – Steve Spray (born 1940), American professional golfer who had one PGA Tour win.
11 August – Gordon J. Brand (born 1955), English professional golfer who had one European Tour win.
28 August – Mike Joyce (born 1939), American professional golfer who had one Senior PGA Tour win.
5 December – Peter Alliss (born 1931), English professional golfer, television presenter, commentator, author and golf course designer. He played on eight Ryder Cup teams, and is known for his commentating at The Open Championship.
22 December – Kevin Hartley (born 1934), Australian amateur golfer who won the Australian Amateur and was part of the Australian team that won the 1966 Eisenhower Trophy.

Table of results
This table summarizes all the results referred to above in date order.

Notes

References

 
2020